Akbarabadi is a surname, denoting those resident in or hailing from the city of Agra (known in the Mughal era as Akbarabad) in Uttar Pradesh, India. It may refer to:

 Akbarabadi Mahal, title of Izz-un-Nissa, wife of Mughal emperor Shah Jahan
 Bekas Akbarabadi, pen name of M. G. Gupta (1925–2011), Indian Urdu poet and research scholar
 Maikash Akbarabadi (1902–1991), 20th-century Indian Urdu poet
 Nazeer Akbarabadi (1740–1830), 18th-century Indian Urdu poet
 Seemab Akbarabadi (1882–1951), Pakistani Urdu poet
 Saeed Ahmad Akbarabadi (1908–1985), Indian Islamic scholar and writer

See also 

 Akbarabadi Mosque, mosque in Delhi built by Akbarabadi Mahal

Surnames
Toponymic surnames
People from Agra
Indian surnames
Urdu-language surnames
Nisbas